The 1999–2000 ISU Junior Grand Prix was the third season of the ISU Junior Grand Prix, a series of international junior level competitions organized by the International Skating Union. It was the junior-level complement to the Grand Prix of Figure Skating, which was for senior-level skaters. Skaters competed in the disciplines of men's singles, ladies' singles, pair skating, and ice dance. The top skaters from the series met at the Junior Grand Prix Final.

Competitions
The locations of the JGP events change yearly. In the 1999–2000 season, the series was composed of the following events:

Junior Grand Prix Final qualifiers
The following skaters qualified for the 1999–2000 Junior Grand Prix Final, in order of qualification.

There were eight qualifiers in singles and six in pairs and ice dance.

There was an unbreakable tie in 4th place standings in the pairs event, and so Chantal Poirier / Craig Buntin of Canada and Aliona Savchenko / Stanislav Morozov of Ukraine both qualified in 4th position. There were no 5th place qualifiers in pairs, because that spot was left empty as a result of the tie for fourth. The two teams had tied exactly, down to the 7th tiebreaker. In later years, a different final tiebreaker was added, one which would have allowed for this tie to be broken.

Medalists

Men

Ladies

Pairs

Ice dance

Medals table

References

External links
 1999–2000 Results

ISU Junior Grand Prix
1999 in figure skating